In functional analysis, a subset of a topological vector space (TVS) is called a barrel or a barrelled set if it is closed convex balanced and absorbing. 

Barrelled sets play an important role in the definitions of several classes of topological vector spaces, such as barrelled spaces.

Definitions 

Let  be a topological vector space (TVS). 

Properties 

Note that every bornivorous ultrabarrel is an ultrabarrel and that every bornivorous suprabarrel is a suprabarrel.

Examples 

 In a semi normed vector space the closed unit ball is a barrel.
 Every locally convex topological vector space has a neighbourhood basis consisting of barrelled sets, although the space itself need not be a barreled space.

See also

References

Bibliography 

 
   
 
 
 
  

Topological vector spaces